Donald Ross Tolmie (11 November 1923 – 18 March 2009) was a Liberal party member of the House of Commons of Canada.

Biography 
Tolmie was born in Lindsay, Ontario and served in World War II as an Avro Lancaster navigator. He became a lawyer in Welland, Ontario where he was an alderman from 1957 to 1964. After this, he entered federal politics winning a seat at the Welland riding in the 1965 general election. Tolmie was re-elected there in 1968, then left federal politics in 1972 after completing his term in the 28th Canadian Parliament.

From October 1971 to September 1972, Tolmie was Parliamentary Secretary to Ron Basford, the Minister of Consumer and Corporate Affairs at that time.

After an undisclosed illness, Tolmie died at his home in Pelham, Ontario on 18 March 2009.

References

External links
 

1923 births
2009 deaths
Royal Canadian Air Force personnel of World War II
Lawyers in Ontario
Liberal Party of Canada MPs
Members of the House of Commons of Canada from Ontario
People from Kawartha Lakes
Royal Canadian Air Force officers